Dari Zanganeh-ye Pain (also Romanized as Dārī Zanganeh-ye Pā’īn) is a village in Ozgoleh Rural District, Ozgoleh District, Salas-e Babajani County, Kermanshah Province, Iran. At the 2006 census, its population was 113, in 20 families.

References 

Populated places in Salas-e Babajani County